Qarah Boltaq (also Romanized as Qarah Bolţāq and Qareh Bolţāq; also known as Ghareh Boltagh, Kareh Būltā, Qarah Bultāq, Qareh Bolţāq-e Bozorg, and Qareh Būltā) is a village in Sardshir Rural District, in the Central District of Buin va Miandasht County, Isfahan Province, Iran. At the 2006 census, its population was 698, in 190 families.

References 

Populated places in Buin va Miandasht County